Myosin-IIIa is a protein that in humans is encoded by the MYO3A gene.

The protein encoded by this gene belongs to the myosin superfamily. Myosins are actin-dependent motor proteins and are categorized into conventional myosins (class II) and unconventional myosins (classes I and III through XV) based on their variable C-terminal cargo-binding domains. Class III myosins, such as this one, have a kinase domain N-terminal to the conserved N-terminal motor domains and are expressed in photoreceptors. The protein encoded by this gene plays an important role in hearing in humans. Three different recessive, loss of function mutations in the encoded protein have been shown to cause nonsyndromic progressive hearing loss. Expression of this gene is highly restricted, with the strongest expression in retina and cochlea.

References

Further reading